Voice of a Murderer (lit. "His Voice") is a 2007 South Korean crime thriller-drama film written and directed by Park Jin-pyo, starring Sol Kyung-gu and Kim Nam-joo. It was the third top-grossing domestic film of 2007, with 3,143,247 tickets sold. The story is a fictionalized account of the real-life kidnapping case of 9-year-old Lee Hyung-ho in 1991.

Plot
One day, the 9-year-old son of famous and successful South Korean news anchor Han Kyung-bae, Sang-woo, disappears without a trace. Later, Kyung-bae receives a phone call from an anonymous person demanding 100,000 dollars as ransom in exchange for the boy's life. The exchange does not happen after the boy's mother Oh Ji-sun gets the police involved.

The police assign detective Kim Wook-jung to the case and assembles a secret investigative task force and forensics team. The kidnapper, sometimes referred to as the "Bastard's Voice", however, seems to be smarter than any of the detectives assigned to the case: He knows not to stay on the phone too long and keeps changing locations for exchanges. Not to mention, his emotionless voice suggests a possibility of him being confident he won't get caught. An example of his cunning is seen when in one potential chance to arrest the kidnapper who gets away with the money, Kim who was hidden in the trunk of Kyung-bae's car, is  kidnapped and tortured by the kidnapper and made a mockery of  when he is left somewhere naked. As time goes by, the boy's parents become restless and angry as the kidnapper continually taunts them through phone calls as he mocks them as he demands ransom. The police have a number of suspects including Kyung-bae's former best friend Lee Jae-joon who has a grudge on the former for getting him sent to prison, but he has an air tight alibi.

The kidnapper calls Kyung-bae once more to ask if has gotten his car back and allows Kyung-bae to hear his son's voice, convincing Kyung-bae that Sang-woo is still alive. However, the kidnapper is fed up with Kyung-bae's increasingly hostile tone with him, he demands that Ji-sun come meet him at a disclosed location in order to get her son back alive. Upon arriving, she finds instructions to pay 100 grand to an account belonging to an alias but during the stressful ordeal faints.

The police and Kyung-bae still believing Lee Jae-joon is the kidnapper continue to investigate and interrogate him further until they find he is not. Then, an investigator specializing in audio forensics reveals that one proof of life, the boy begging for his life over the phone is a tape recording. This results in the police suggesting to Kyung-bae they make the case public. The kidnapper once again calls to demand another 100 grand put on a specified location in Lotte World. Kyung-bae decides to be done with the agonizing experience and follows the kidnapper's instructions and puts the money for the kidnapper to retrieve it, only to find his son is not present in the promised location.

Upon the 44th day of Sang-woo's kidnapping, police find the young boy's lifeless body near the Han River park. Soon, Kyung-bae returns to his anchor chair to report on his own story and pleads with the public to help him catch Sang-woo's murderer before playing a recording of the murderer's voice for the audience to hear.

Cast
Sol Kyung-gu as Han Kyung-bae
Kim Nam-joo as Oh Ji-sun
Kim Yeong-cheol as Detective Kim Wook-jung
Song Young-chang as Captain Noh
Go Soo-hee as Detective Cha Soo-hee
Kim Kwang-kyu as Insepector
Choi Jung-yoon as Anchorwoman Ha Joo-won
Na Moon-hee as Kyung-bae's mother
Yoon Je-moon as Priest
Kang Dong-won as Kidnapper
Park Jin-woo  as Detective Park
Kim Ik-tae as Chief of police
Jang Won-young as Dr. Choi
Lee Hyung-chul as Han Sang-woo
Jeon Hye-jin as Lee Ae-sook
Im Jong-yoon as Lee Jae-joon
Jo Seok-hyun as Detective Jo
Kim Young-pil as Han In-seok

Background
The film is based on the real-life abduction of nine-year-old Lee Hyung-ho on January 29, 1991. The killer was never caught, and the 15-year statute of limitations on the case expired in 2006.

Awards and nominations
2007 Grand Bell Awards
 Nomination – Best Actor – Sol Kyung-gu

2007 Blue Dragon Film Awards
 Nomination – Best Film
 Nomination – Best Director – Park Jin-pyo
 Nomination – Best Actor – Sol Kyung-gu

2007 Korean Film Awards
 Nomination – Best Sound – Kim Suk-won, Kim Chang-seop

References

External links 
 
 
 

-

2007 films
2007 crime thriller films
South Korean crime thriller films
Crime films based on actual events
Police detective films
Films set in 1991
Films about kidnapping
Films about mass media people
Films set in Seoul
Films shot in Seoul
Films directed by Park Jin-pyo
2000s Korean-language films
2000s South Korean films